Lundius is a surname. Notable people with the surname include:

 Carolus Lundius, Swedish professor
 Daniel Lundius, Swedish bishop
 Marianne Lundius (born 1949), Swedish lawyer and judge